Season 2018–19 saw Greenock Morton compete in the Scottish Championship the second tier of Scottish football, having finished seventh in 2017–18. Morton also competed in the Challenge Cup, Scottish League Cup and the Scottish Cup.

Fixtures and results

Pre–Season

Scottish Championship

Scottish League Cup

Group stage
Results

Scottish Challenge Cup

Scottish Cup

Player statistics

|-
|colspan="12"|Players who left the club during the 2018–19 season
|-

|}

Team Statistics

League table

Division summary

League cup table

References

Greenock Morton F.C. seasons
Greenock Morton